Events in the year 1939 in China.

Incumbents
President: Lin Sen
Premier: H.H. Kung (until December 11), Chiang Kai-shek (from December 11)
Vice Premier: Chang Ch'ün (until December 11), Kung Hsiang-hsi (from December 11)
Foreign Minister: Wang Ch'ung-hui

Events

January
January - The British Hong Kong Government had announced that it will ban the export of weapons and ammunition to the Republic of China via the land boundary of Hong Kong.

February
February - Hainan Island Operation
February 21 - Shenzhen and Lo Wu were bombed by Japanese army, 30 people were killed or injured, Japanese government paid 20,000 HK$ to the British Hong Kong government.
February - The Hong Kong Government negotiated with the Japanese army,  resume shipping between Hong Kong and Guangzhou.

March
March 17-May 9 - Battle of Nanchang
March - Battle of Xiushui River

April
April 20-May 24 - Battle of Suixian–Zaoyang

June
June - Swatow Operation
June 14-August 20 - Tientsin Incident

September
September 13-October 8 - Battle of Changsha (1939)

December
This month, Chongqing National Government required the assembly of four commercial transport aircraft provided by US companies in Hong Kong, which was rejected by the British Hong Kong Government.

Births
February 19 – Erin Pizzey, author and founder of the first domestic violence shelter in the modern world
February 28 - Daniel C. Tsui
July - Zeng Qinghong

Deaths
February 21 – Yu Xiusong, an early member of the Chinese Communist Party.
December 4 – Wu Peifu

See also
 List of Chinese films of the 1930s

References

 
1930s in China
Years of the 20th century in China